The Khodzhaosmansk or Khodzhaosman Formation is an Aptian to Albian geologic formation in Kyrgyzstan. Dinosaur remains and fossil dinosaur eggs have been reported from the formation.

Fossil content 
The following fossils have been reported from the formation:
 ?Hadrosauridae indet.
 Choristodera indet.
 Ornithischia indet.

See also 
 List of dinosaur-bearing rock formations
 List of stratigraphic units with dinosaur trace fossils
 Dinosaur eggs

References

Bibliography

Further reading 
 L. A. Nessov. 1995. Dinozavri severnoi Yevrazii: Novye dannye o sostave kompleksov, ekologii i paleobiogeografii [Dinosaurs of northern Eurasia: new data about assemblages, ecology, and paleobiogeography]. Institute for Scientific Research on the Earth's Crust, St. Petersburg State University, St. Petersburg 1-156

Geologic formations of Kyrgyzstan
Lower Cretaceous Series of Asia
Albian Stage
Aptian Stage
Ooliferous formations
Paleontology in Kyrgyzstan